Tatiana Ilyuchenko is a Russian female visually impaired cross-country skier and biathlete. She won a bronze medal at the 2010 Winter Paralympics

Career 
She participated at five Paralympic Games, including the 2006 Winter Paralympics, and the 2010 Winter Paralympics.  
She participated at the 2009 Paralympic Winter World Cup

References

External links 
 Tatiana Ilyuchenko of Russia (3) and Oksana Shyshkova of Ukraine (7) compete in the Women's 1km, Getty
 https://www.paralympic.org/asp/lib/TheASP.asp?pageid=8937&sportid=-567&personid=919350&WinterGames=-1

Living people
Russian female cross-country skiers
Russian female biathletes
Cross-country skiers at the 2010 Winter Paralympics
Cross-country skiers at the 2006 Winter Paralympics
Biathletes at the 2010 Winter Paralympics
Biathletes at the 2006 Winter Paralympics
Paralympic cross-country skiers of Russia
Paralympic biathletes of Russia
Paralympic gold medalists for Russia
Paralympic bronze medalists for Russia
Medalists at the 2010 Winter Paralympics
Medalists at the 2006 Winter Paralympics
Visually impaired category Paralympic competitors
1992 births
Paralympic medalists in cross-country skiing
Paralympic medalists in biathlon
Sportspeople from Barnaul
21st-century Russian women
Russian blind people